Kanglung Gewog (Dzongkha: བཀང་ལུང་) is a gewog (village block) of Trashigang District, Bhutan.

References 

Gewogs of Bhutan
Trashigang District